The 2011–12 NBL Canada season was the inaugural season of the National Basketball League of Canada.

Draft
The 2011 NBL Canada Draft was held August 21, 2011. The Oshawa Power had the first pick and selected shooting guard Morgan Lewis.

Regular season
The regular season began October 29, 2011 with the Quebec Kebs defeating the Moncton Miracles 102–97.

Standings

Playoffs

References

 
National Basketball League of Canada seasons
NBL